Martin Maes (born 27 January 1997) is a Belgian Enduro and Downhill cyclist.

He participated at the 2018 UCI Mountain Bike World Championships, winning a medal.

References

External links

1997 births
Living people
Belgian male cyclists
Downhill mountain bikers
Belgian mountain bikers